On July 10 2021, a 5.7 magnitude earthquake struck 20 km southeast of the Rasht Valley in Tajikistan.

Tectonic setting
Tajikistan lies within the complex zone of collision between the Indian Plate and the Eurasian Plate. The dominant structures in this area are a combination of thrust faults and sinistral (left lateral) strike-slip faults.

Earthquake
It was followed by 20 aftershocks. The earthquake struck at the 72nd anniversary of the 1949 Khait earthquake.

Impact
Five people were killed. The victims were a 70-year old mother and four children between the ages of 6 and 12 who died in Tajikabad District. 30 people were also injured, and 5,560 people were displaced. Hundreds of homes were damaged or destroyed, including 300 in Langarisho jamoat, seven in Hijborak, and 12 in Ashkalon.

Other events
A deep 5.9 magnitude earthquake struck the Gorno-Badakhshan region near the border with Xinjiang, China on February 12, 2021. In the Kashmir region of Pakistan, a woman fell and died while she was in a panic, and several others were injured.

See also

List of earthquakes in 2021
List of earthquakes in Tajikistan
2015 Tajikistan earthquake
1989 Gissar earthquake
1911 Sarez earthquake

References

Rasht
Rasht
Earthquake
Tajikistan earthquake
Geology of Tajikistan
2021 earthquakes in Asia